The 1978 Colgate Series Championships was a women's tennis tournament played on outdoor hard courts at the Mission Hills Country Club in Palm Springs, California in the United States that was the season-ending tournament of the 1978 Virginia Slims World Championship Series. It was the second edition of the tournament and was held from November 14 through November 19, 1978. Chris Evert won the singles title and earned $75,000 first-prize money.

Finals

Singles
 Chris Evert defeated  Martina Navratilova 6–3, 6–3
 It was Evert's 6th singles title of the year and the 84th of her career.

Doubles
 Billie Jean King /  Martina Navratilova defeated  Wendy Turnbull /  Kerry Reid 6–3, 6–4

Prize money 

Doubles prize money is per team.

See also
 Evert–Navratilova rivalry
 1978 Virginia Slims Championships

References

External links
 International Tennis Federation (ITF) tournament edition details

Virginia Slims of Washington
1978 in sports in California
Tennis in California